Each team in the 2018 FIFA Club World Cup had to name a 23-man squad (three of whom must be goalkeepers). FIFA announced the squads on 6 December 2018. The squad of the CONMEBOL representative was confirmed after the 2018 Copa Libertadores Finals second leg on 9 December 2018.

Al Ain

Manager:  Zoran Mamić

Guadalajara

Manager:  José Cardozo

Espérance Sportive de Tunis

Manager:  Moïne Chaâbani

Kashima Antlers

Manager:  Go Oiwa

Real Madrid

Manager:  Santiago Solari

River Plate

Manager:  Marcelo Gallardo

Team Wellington

Manager:  Jose Figueira

References

External links
 Official FIFA Club World Cup website

Squads
FIFA Club World Cup squads